Bagher Niari; is an Iranian Football forward who currently played for Iranian football club Nassaji in the Iran Pro League.

Club career

Saipa
He started his career with Saipa from youth levels. As winter 2015 he joined to first team by Majid Jalali. He made his debut for Saipa on February 19, 2015 against Foolad as a substitute for Hadi Rekabi.

Club career statistics

International career

U17
He was part of Iran U–17 in 2014 AFC U-16 Championship.

References

External links
 Bagher Niari at IranLeague.ir

Living people
Iranian footballers
Saipa F.C. players
Sportspeople from Tehran
1998 births
Association football wingers